Patrovskaya is a rural locality (a village) in Kargopolsky District, Arkhangelsk Oblast, Russia. The population was 319 as of 2012. There is 1 street.

Geography 
Patrovskaya is located 44 km southwest of Kargopol (the district's administrative centre) by road. Filosofskaya is the nearest rural locality.

References 

Rural localities in Kargopolsky District
Vytegorsky Uyezd